Stanley Ivan Russell  (26 March 1906 – 29 November 2005) was a New Zealand local-body politician. He served as Mayor of Nelson from 1956 to 1962.

Early life and family
Russell was born in Christchurch, the son of George Philip Russell. His family moved to the King Country, then Motueka and Tākaka before settling in Nelson in 1919. He was educated at Nelson College from 1920 to 1923.

In 1929, his father founded G P Russell and Sons (now Russells Curtains and Blinds) as a new and used furniture business located at 176 Bridge Street, Nelson. Russell worked in the family business, eventually becoming its managing director.

Political career 
His father was on the City Council until 1944. Russell was elected to Council that same year. He remained on the City Council until 1965 and was the mayor of Nelson from 1956 to 1962.

While there he campaigned for pensioner flats, resulting in the "Russell Flats" in Waimea Road being constructed. He was also involved in establishing the Nelson Civic Trust in early 1973.

Russell supported his fellow Council member, Sonja Davies, in seeking to have the Nelson Institute library transferred to the Nelson City Council. The Institute finally agreed in 1964. A fee was charged for taking out books until 1972, when it became free.

He was chair of the YMCA and was a Labour Party supporter.

In the 1961 New Year Honours, Russell was appointed an Officer of the Order of the British Empire, for services to local government.

Russell died at Nelson, aged 99, on 29 November 2005, and his ashes were buried at Wakapuaka Cemetery.

References 

1906 births
2005 deaths
People educated at Nelson College
Mayors of Nelson, New Zealand
New Zealand Officers of the Order of the British Empire
People from Christchurch
20th-century New Zealand politicians
Burials at Wakapuaka Cemetery
YMCA leaders